Susan Hillmore is an English author and painter living in Gloucestershire.  She studied fine art at the Camberwell School of Art and has exhibited at the Royal Academy.  She has also written two novels:
The Greenhouse (1988) which was shortlisted for the Sunday Express Book of the Year
Malaria (2000)

References

External links
Alex Clark on a prophetic tale of ecological destruction in Susan Hillmore's Malaria from The Guardian

Alumni of Camberwell College of Arts
Living people
People from Gloucestershire
English women novelists
20th-century English novelists
20th-century English women writers
Year of birth missing (living people)